Saawan... The Love Season is a 2006 Indian Hindi-language romance film directed by Saawan Kumar, starring Saloni Aswani, Kapil Jhaveri, Ranjeet, Prem Chopra and Salman Khan.

Plot

Saawan... The Love Season tells the story of a couple, Raj and Kajal. They get married, and when they come back from their Honeymoon in Patiala, Kajal finds a man who predicts the future. Whether it's the death of a person at 9 p.m. or a major accident on the Mumbai-Pune Expressway, the man knows it all. He's a modern-day Nostradamus. When Kajal asks him about her future, he tells her she'd die two days later. Obviously, Kajal is shattered, she tells Raj who swears if anything happens to her, he would kill the Nostradamus. On the fateful day, Kajal is mistakenly shot by the cops outside a shopping mall and dies. Raj blames the Nostradamus for it, breaks into his house, bashes him black and blue and Nostradamus dies. As Nostradamus dies, he predicts his own death. When Nostradamus dies, Kajal, who is already pronounced dead, wakes up. She's alive now. She falls in love with Raj all over again, and with the help of Raj's friend Funsukh and his admirer, the couple get remarried and they live happily ever after.

Cast
Salman Khan as Bhagwan's Messenger
Saloni Aswani as Kajal F. Kapoor / a.k.a. Kajal F. Cappar
Kapil Jhaveri as Raj
Prem Chopra as Fakirchand "Fakki Cappar" Kapoor
Ranjeet as Raj's dad
Sheela David as Ranjeet's mom 
Johnny Lever as Funsukh
Bobby Darling as Funsukh's Admirer
Kiran Rathod as herself
Javed Akbar as Doctor
Sapna as Kajal's sister

Soundtrack
 Punjabi Ankhonwali - Shaan, Sunidhi Chauhan
 Tu Mila De - Sonu Nigam  music composer Sajid–Wajid
 Ready for Love -  Vasundhara Das
 Saawan...... The Love Season - Sunidhi Chauhan, Shaan
 Jo Maangi Khuda se - Kunal Ganjawala
 Mere Dil Ko Dil Ki Dhadkan Ko - Shaan,  Shreya Ghoshal
 Jo Maangi Khuda Se (Female) - Jaspinder Narula

References

External links
 

2000s Hindi-language films
2006 films
Films scored by Aadesh Shrivastava
Films directed by Saawan Kumar Tak